A by-election was held in the state electoral district of Ryde on 3 February 1945. The by-election was triggered by the death of James Shand.

The by-election was won by  candidate Eric Hearnshaw. This was the first election contested and first election won by the Liberal Party in New South Wales since the founding of its New South Wales division a month earlier in January 1945. Hearnshaw also became the first Liberal Party member in the New South Wales parliament, as at the time, parliamentary members of the Democratic Party had yet to join the Liberal Party.

Dates

Results

James Shand died.

See also
Electoral results for the district of Ryde
List of New South Wales state by-elections

References

1945 elections in Australia
New South Wales state by-elections
1940s in New South Wales
February 1945 events in Australia